A'umi is a village on the central south coast of Tutuila Island, American Samoa.

It is located to the east of Pago Pago Harbor and west of Alega.

Fatuto'aga Rock (Pyramid Rock) is an islet which lies outside Lauli'i near Aumi. Eastbound buses from Downtown Pago Pago go to the beaches near Pyramid Rock.

Demographics

References

Villages in American Samoa
Tutuila